Rodrigo David Meléndez Araya (born 3 October 1977) is Chilean former professional footballer and manager. He played as a defensive midfielder in his years active.

During his football career, he has won seven Chilean league titles with Colo-Colo and Cobreloa.

International career
He has represented Chile at Copa América in 2004 and 2007.

International goals

Personal life
His son, Javier, is a professional footballer from the Colo-Colo youth ranks who made his professional debut playing for Cobreloa in 2021.

Honours

Player
Cobreloa
 Primera División: 2003 Clausura

Colo-Colo
 Primera División (6): 2006-A, 2006-C, 2007-A, 2007-C, 2008-C, 2009-C
 Copa Sudamericana: Runner-up 2006

References

External links
 
 
 

1977 births
Living people
Footballers from Santiago
Association football midfielders
Chilean footballers
Chilean expatriate footballers
Chile international footballers
Cobreloa footballers
Quilmes Atlético Club footballers
Estudiantes de La Plata footballers
Colo-Colo footballers
Deportes Iquique footballers
San Luis de Quillota footballers
San Antonio Unido footballers
Chilean Primera División players
Primera B de Chile players
Segunda División Profesional de Chile players
Argentine Primera División players
Expatriate footballers in Argentina
Chilean expatriate sportspeople in Argentina
2004 Copa América players
2007 Copa América players
Chilean football managers
Deportes Melipilla managers
Cobreloa managers
Segunda División Profesional de Chile managers
Primera B de Chile managers